Aphilodontidae is a monophyletic clade of soil centipedes in the family Geophilidae found in South America and South Africa. These centipedes are closely related to Geoperingueyia and characterized by shieldlike setae on the front of the head, lateral parts of the flattened cuticle above the mouthparts, and combined forcipular trochanteroprefemur and femur. The number of legs in this clade varies within species and ranges from 35 to 87 pairs of legs.

Genera
Aphilodon Silvestri, 1898
Mecophilus Silvestri, 1909
Mairata Calvanese, Brescovit & Bonato
Philacroterium Attems, 1926

References

Centipede genera